Oniken is a side-scrolling action platform video game developed and published by independent Brazilian studio Joymasher for Microsoft Windows, OS X and Linux. The game was released worldwide for Microsoft Windows on June 21, 2012, on OS X and Linux on November 20, 2012, and on Nintendo Switch on February 1, 2019 as Oniken: Unstoppable Edition. In August 2012, the developers have announced that the game was accepted on Steam Greenlight.

Gameplay 

The game has an 8-bit style and follows a classic slasher gameplay formula similar to Strider, Ninja Gaiden and Shatterhand.

The objective in the game is to get to the end of each level and beat the boss for the level. There are six levels in the game and an extra mission with an additional character in Contra gameplay style after you beat the game.

Plot 
Taking place in a post-apocalyptic future, human kind has nearly been completely destroyed by global war. Those few humans that have managed to survive are being oppressed by a cybernetic armada known as the Oniken. A small resistance led by General Zhukov attempt to defend against the Oniken but are ultimately overwhelmed by their forces. Zaku (a legendary ninja mercenary, with an unknown past) who is believed to be the only one capable of stopping the Oniken, is approached by Zhukov and asked to join the resistance movement against the robotic forces, to which Zaku obliges.

Development 

Oniken was developed by the duo consisting of friends Danilo Dias (JoyMasher) and Pedro Paiva (then Arcaica, now Menos Playstation) as a means for them to pay homage to their favorite games from the 8-bit era, such as Ninja Gaiden, Contra, Kabuki Quantum Fighter, Shadow of the Ninja and Vice: Project Doom. Zaku's character design was highly inspired by that of Kenshiro from Fist of the North Star fame.

Reception 
Shortly after release, Oniken was included in the July Jubilee bundle, part of the series of bundles on Indie Royale, a Desura indie bundle service. It received a score of 7/10 on Destructoid. Multiplayer.it gave it 8.0/10.

References

External links 
 Last archived version of official website (Wayback Machine)

2012 video games
Action video games
Video games about cyborgs
Indie video games
Linux games
MacOS games
Video games about ninja
Nintendo Switch games
Platform games
Post-apocalyptic video games
Retro-style video games
Video games about robots
Science fiction video games
Side-scrolling video games
Single-player video games
Steam Greenlight games
Video games developed in Brazil
Video games featuring female protagonists
Windows games
Xbox One games
Japan in non-Japanese culture
JoyMasher games